Radio Mango is a Bosnian local commercial radio station, broadcasting from Livno, Bosnia and Herzegovina. Radio station was founded on 10 August 1998 as Radio Studio N. Since 3 November 2020, radio station is using current name.

This radio station broadcasts a variety of programs such as music, talk show and local news. The owner of the radio station is the company MANGO d.o.o. Livno 

Program is mainly produced in Croatian at two FM frequencies and it is available in the city of Livno and in Canton 10, parts of West Herzegovina Canton and in neighboring Croatia.

Estimated number of listeners of Radio Mango is around 33,071.

Frequencies
 Livno   
 Livno

See also 
 List of radio stations in Bosnia and Herzegovina
 Radio Livno
 Radio Drvar
 Radio Tomislavgrad
 Radio Posušje
 Radio postaja Široki Brijeg
 RGM

References

External links 
 www.radiomango.eu
  www.radiostanica.ba
 Communications Regulatory Agency of Bosnia and Herzegovina

Livno
Radio stations established in 1998
Radio stations established in 2020

Mass media in Livno